Torthorwald Castle is a large ruined rectangular tower at the centre of the village of Torthorwald just outside Dumfries in south west Scotland.

History

The first castle on the site was an earthwork motte-and-bailey built in the 12th century.  The earliest building which forms part of the current ruins was built in the 14th century.

Clan Kirkpatrick

Torthorwald Castle was originally owned by Sir David Torthorwald in the 13th Century, some of his descendants supported the English army during the First War of Scottish Independence, because of it, King Robert the Bruce confiscated the lands in 1306 and granted them to Sir John de Soules (Guardian of Scotland), but he died in  After John's death in Ireland in 1310, after it passed to the Scottish clan, when Humphrey de Kirkpatrick acquired the lands in 1326, and they started the stone structure of the castle that became the Torthowarld castle.

Carlyle family

In 1425 William Carlyle married the Kirkpatrick heiress and Torthorwald Castle passed to Carlyle family. In 1544 the castle was attacked by Michael Lord Carlyle and sacked, in his raid against his sister-in-law, Jonet Scrimgeour. She was reinstated by Regent Arran  - James Hamilton, Earl of Arran - and the legal settlement includes a list of the contents of the Castle in the Scots language, and the farmstock in Latin. Michael Lord Carlyle retained the castle until the latter decades of the sixteenth century.

Douglas family

In 1609 the ownership of the castle passed from Michael Carlyle to his half brother Douglases of Parkhead since then became property of the Douglas family, the last resident of the castle was Archibald Douglas of Dornock whom lived there until 1630.

Ruins and restoration

The roof of the castle was removed in the eighteenth century, after it the Torthorwald castle drifted into ruin, during the next century efforts were made to stabilise it's structure. In 1993 the north end of the tower collapsed. 

The basement and first floor hall of this tower are vaulted and in one corner is a turnpike stair that leads to the upper floors. It appears that the original entrance was on the first floor.

See also

 Clan Douglas
 Clan Kirkpatrick
 Lord Carlyle of Torthorwald

References
 Coventry, Martin (2001) The Castles of Scotland, 3rd Ed. Scotland: Goblinshead  
 Maxwell-Irving, A. M. T. (2000) The Border Towers of Scotland, Creedon Publications

External links
 Overview of Torthorwald
 Torthorwald Castle, Dumfries and Galloway

Castles in Dumfries and Galloway
Dumfriesshire